Euryope batesi is a species of leaf beetle of East Africa and the Democratic Republic of the Congo. It was first described from the Nguru Mountains by Martin Jacoby in 1880.

References 

Eumolpinae
Beetles of the Democratic Republic of the Congo
Taxa named by Martin Jacoby
Beetles described in 1880
Insects of East Africa